Don't panic may refer to:

Books
 "Don't Panic" (The Hitchhiker's Guide to the Galaxy), a catchphrase from The Hitchhiker's Guide to the Galaxy by Douglas Adams
 Don't Panic: The Official Hitchhiker's Guide to the Galaxy Companion, a 1988 book by Neil Gaiman

Film and television
 "Don't panic!", a catchphrase of Lance-Corporal Jack Jones from the British TV series Dad's Army
 "Don't Panic!", the English title for a Spanish language 1988 film originally named "El secreto de la ouija"; see Juan Ignacio Aranda 
 Don't Panic — The Truth about Population, a 2013 television documentary

Music
 Don't Panic (All Time Low album), 2012
 Don't Panic (Section Boyz album), a 2015 mixtape and song by Section Boyz
 "Don't Panic" (Coldplay song), a 2001 song
 "Don't Panic" (French Montana song), a 2014 song 
 "Don't Panic", a song by Ellie Goulding from her 2015 album Delirium
 "Don't Panic", a song by Lena from her 2012 album Stardust